Ondřej Štursa (born 17 June 2000) is a Czech football player who plays for FC Viktoria Plzeň.

References

External links
 
 

2000 births
Living people
People from Sokolov
Czech footballers
Association football forwards
FC Viktoria Plzeň players
FK Dukla Prague players
FK Baník Sokolov players
Czech First League players
Czech National Football League players
Sportspeople from the Karlovy Vary Region